Roknabad (also Romanized as Roknābād; also known as Rowkhnābād and Ruknābād) is a village in Jolgeh Rural District Rural District, Shahrabad District, Bardaskan County, Razavi Khorasan Province, Iran. At the 2006 census, its population was 1,963, in 513 families.

References 

Populated places in Bardaskan County